The wārid (plural: wāridāt) is the divine effect of  and  practice on the  of  and  and  in Islamic sufism.

Presentation 

The  access with his  to transcendent knowledge and spiritual status.

Blessings 

Kinds

Citations 
 Ahmad ibn Ajiba said:

 Ibn Ata Allah al-Iskandari said:

Misconducts 
Hazem Abu Ghazaleh said about Sufis' misconducts about the waridates:

See also 
 Wird

References 

Sufism
Spiritual practice
Language and mysticism
Arabic words and phrases
Islamic belief and doctrine
Islamic terminology